Teiglach , also spelled taiglach or teglach (singular teigel, literally "little dough") are small, knotted pastries boiled in a honeyed syrup. They are a traditional Ashkenazi Jewish treat for Rosh Hashana, Sukkot, Simchat Torah, and Purim.

History
Teiglach date back to the times of the Romans who made strips of fried dough in honey called vermiculi. Italian Jews adopted the dish but it disappeared from their repertoire in the Middle Ages. In the 12th century Franco-German rabbis mentioned eating a dish of fried or baked strips of dough covered in honey called vermesel or verimlish at the beginning of the Sabbath meal. The name went through changes, being called gremsel and then chremsel in Eastern Europe. It is popular on Rosh Hashanah, when it is traditional to eat sweet foods made with honey to usher in a sweet new year.

References

External links
 JoyofKosher.com: Teiglach Recipe and Video
 RecipeLink.com: Teiglach
 Jewish Recipes: Teiglach
 Cyber Kitchen: Teiglach recipe
 Finkel, Sara (1989). Classic Kosher Cooking. Southfield, Mich.:Targum Press Inc. 

Ashkenazi Jewish cuisine
Cookies